The following is a list of cities in Sindh province, Pakistan.

References

Populated places in Sindh
Sindh